John William Williams (March 23, 1869 – November 15, 1934) was an American lawyer who served as Clerk of the Virginia House of Delegates from 1901 to his death in 1934. He served as that body's journal clerk from 1895 to 1901.

References

External links

1869 births
1934 deaths
People from Pearisburg, Virginia